Calviac is a former commune in the Lot department in south-western France. On 1 January 2016, it was merged into the new commune of Sousceyrac-en-Quercy. Its population was 148 in 2019.

See also
Communes of the Lot department

References

Former communes of Lot (department)